The Kuchai MRT station is a mass rapid transit (MRT) station in the suburb of Kuchai Lama in southwestern Kuala Lumpur, Malaysia. It is one of the stations on the MRT Putrajaya Line. 

The station was opened to public on 16 March 2023.

Station details

Location 
The station is located on, and named after, Jalan Kuchai Lama, narrowly missing Old Klang Road and Taman OUG, and is near the Kuchai Lama exit 907 of the Besraya toll road.

Exits and entrances 
The station has only 1 entrance for the time being.

References

External links
 Klang Valley Mass Rapid Transit
 MRT Hawk-Eye View

Rapid transit stations in Kuala Lumpur
Sungai Buloh-Serdang-Putrajaya Line